Christopher Carlos Clark (born November 7, 1996) is a Puerto Rican international footballer who plays as a defensive midfielder for the collegiate Albany Great Danes men's soccer team and the Puerto Rican national team.

Personal life
Clark is the son of Chris Clark and Carmen Baker-Clark. Has three brothers as well as three step sisters. While at Teaneck High School, Clark scored 36 goals and registered 32 assists as well as being the team captain for two years.

International career
Clark was called up by Puerto Rican head coach Jack Stefanowski for June matches against the United States national team as well as the first round of 2017 Caribbean Cup qualification.

References

External links
PDL Profile

1996 births
Living people
American soccer players
People from Teaneck, New Jersey
Soccer players from New Jersey
Sportspeople from Bergen County, New Jersey
Teaneck High School alumni
Puerto Rican footballers
Puerto Rico international footballers
Association football midfielders
Albany Great Danes men's soccer players
Jersey Express S.C. players
USL League Two players